CM156 is a piperazine based chemical compound with nanomolar affinity for both sigma receptor subtypes that has been shown to counteract the deleterious effects of administered cocaine.

See also 
 3C-PEP
 MT-45

References 

Piperazines